The 1989 New Mexico State Aggies football team was an American football team that represented New Mexico State University in the Big West Conference during the 1989 NCAA Division I-A football season. In their fourth year under head coach Mike Knoll, the Aggies compiled an 0–11 record. The team played its home games at Aggie Memorial Stadium in Las Cruces, New Mexico.

Schedule

References

New Mexico State
New Mexico State Aggies football seasons
New Mexico State Aggies football
College football winless seasons